Thongkhong Laxmi Bazar is a town and a nagar panchayat in Imphal West district in the Indian state of Manipur.

Demographics
 India census, Thongkhong Laxmi Bazar had a population of 12,779. Males constitute 50% of the population and females 50%. Thongkhong Laxmi Bazar has an average literacy rate of 58%, lower than the national average of 59.5%: male literacy is 69%, and female literacy is 46%. In Thongkhong Laxmi Bazar, 16% of the population is under 6 years of age.

References

Cities and towns in Imphal West district